Belgium was represented by Lize Marke, with the song "Als het weer lente is", at the 1965 Eurovision Song Contest, which took place on 20 March in Naples. Marke was chosen internally to be the Belgian representative, and the song was chosen in the national final on 13 February. Marke had previously finished second in the Belgian preselection in 1963.

There was a minor controversy after the selection when it came to light that "Als het weer lente is" had previously been performed on TV (by the following year's Belgian representative Tonia), but after some deliberation broadcaster BRT decided not to disqualify the song, as none of the rules of the European Broadcasting Union in effect at the time regarding song selection had been broken.

Before Eurovision

Artist selection
In December 1964, BRT announced that they had internally selected Lize Marke to represent Belgium in the Eurovision Song Contest 1965.

De Belgische finale voor het Eurovisie Songfestival
De Belgische finale voor het Eurovisie Songfestival was the national final format developed by BRT in order to select Belgium's entry for the Eurovision Song Contest 1965.

Competing entries
Following the announcement of Marke as Belgian representative, a song submission period was opened, in which composers were able to submit their songs until 10 January 1965. More than 200 songs were received by the broadcaster at the closing of the deadline, from which 6 were selected for the national final.

Final
The final was held on 13 February 1965 at 20:50 CET at the Amerikaans Theater in Brussels and was hosted by Nand Baert.  Six songs competed in the contest with the winner being decided upon by a 40-member jury, 20 members of which were "professionals", while the another 20 were representatives of the Flemish public.

At Eurovision 
On the night of the final Marke performed 8th in the running order, following Norway and preceding Monaco. Voting was by each national jury awarding 5, 3 and 1 points to its three favourite songs. At the close of the voting "Als het weer lente is" was one of four songs (along with the entries from Finland, Germany and Spain) which had failed to register a single point. This was the third time that Belgium had found itself at the foot of the Eurovision scoreboard, and the second (and to date last) time the country had finished with the infamous nul-points.

The Belgian jury vote was unique under this system, as only two songs had received any votes at all from the 10 jury members. Under the rules then in effect, this meant that they awarded 6 points (rather than the apparent maximum 5) to the United Kingdom and 3 points to Italy.

Voting 
Belgium did not receive any points at the 1965 Eurovision Song Contest.

References 

1965
Countries in the Eurovision Song Contest 1965
Eurovision